Ana (English: Ego) is a Pakistani drama that aired on Geo Entertainment. It is a story about an egotistic man and the people in his life.

Cast
 Talat Hussain          
 Humayun Saeed  
 Samina Peerzada   
 Shahzad Nawaz
 Javeria Saud
 Aijaz Aslam
 Parveen Akbar
 Raju Jamil
 Javeria Abbasi
 Ahsan Khan
 Nazli Nasr
 Shehroz Sabzwari
 Mubashir Abbas

Lux Style Awards 
 Best TV Play (Satellite)-Won
 Best TV Actor (Satellite)-Talat Hussain-Nominated
 Best TV Actress (Satellite)-Samina Peerzada-Nominated

References

Pakistani drama television series